Japhet N'Doram (born 27 February 1966) is a Chadian former professional footballer who played as a striker.

His 14-year senior career was mainly spent with Nantes, which he represented in several capacities. He was nicknamed The Wizard.

Club career
Born in N'Djamena, N'Doram begun his career with local Tourbillon FC, then spent three seasons in Cameroon with Tonnerre Yaoundé, one of the biggest clubs in Sub-Saharan Africa. In 1990 the 24-year-old signed for FC Nantes in France, scoring two goals in 19 games in his first season in Ligue 1; his first professional contract arrived as Argentine Jorge Burruchaga was recovering from injury and accepted to be given an amateur licence on behalf of his teammate.

N'Doram became something of a cult hero at Stade de la Beaujoire, scoring important goals as the club's 2000th in the top division, through a penalty against Lille OSC (1–0 win) or the second in a 3–2 home triumph against Juventus F.C. in the 1995–96 UEFA Champions League semi-finals (3–4 aggregate loss). In 1994–95, he netted 12 goals as Les Canaris won their seventh national championship – the first in 12 years – bettering to a career-best 21 in the 1996–97 campaign (second-best in the competition).

Aged 31, N'Doram left Nantes and signed for fellow league side AS Monaco FC, winning the 1997 Trophée des Champions, but retired at the end of the season following a persistent injury sustained during a match against his former team. He then joined his last club's technical staff, working as a scout.

N'Doram returned to Nantes on 28 June 2005, replacing Robert Budzynski as director of football. In February 2007 he was appointed team manager, leaving his post in July as the season ended in relegation.

Personal life
N'Doram's son, Kévin, is also a footballer. He too played for Monaco.

Career statistics

Honours
Nantes Atlantique
French Division 1: 1994–95

 AS Monaco
Trophée des Champions: 1997

References

External links

1966 births
Living people
People from N'Djamena
Chadian footballers
Association football forwards
Tonnerre Yaoundé players
Ligue 1 players
FC Nantes players
AS Monaco FC players
Chad international footballers
Chadian football managers
Ligue 1 managers
FC Nantes managers
Chadian expatriate footballers
Chadian expatriate sportspeople in France
Expatriate footballers in Cameroon
Expatriate footballers in France
Expatriate footballers in Monaco
Expatriate football managers in France